Chakravarti may refer to:

 Chakravartin, an ideal for an emperor in South Asia
 Chakravarti (surname) (including list of people with the name)